Chorivalva bisaccula is a moth of the family Gelechiidae. It is found in Korea, the Russian Far East and Japan.

The wingspan is 10–13 mm. The pattern of the markings on the forewings is similar to Chorivalva unisaccula, but the ground colour is generally darker, but is quite variable among individuals, ranging from dark grey to yellowish or greyish orange.

The larvae feed on Quercus mongolica and Quercus acutissima.

References

Moths described in 1988
Litini